Kenneth Eugene Sears (July 6, 1917 in Streator, Illinois – July 17, 1968 in Bridgeport, Texas) was an American professional baseball catcher who played in Major League Baseball (MLB) during the  and  seasons. He played with the New York Yankees and the St. Louis Browns. He had a .282 career batting average in 67 career games and batted left and threw right-handed. He played college baseball at the University of Alabama.

He played in the minor leagues for 8 seasons with the Amsterdam Rugmakers, Norfolk Tars, Newark Bears, Kansas City Blues, San Antonio Missions, Little Rock Travelers and Borger Gassers.

Sears was the son of Ziggy Sears, an MLB umpire.

References

External links

Major League Baseball catchers
New York Yankees players
St. Louis Browns players
Amsterdam Rugmakers players
Norfolk Tars players
Newark Bears (IL) players
Kansas City Blues (baseball) players
San Antonio Missions players
Little Rock Travelers players
Borger Gassers players
Baseball players from Illinois
Alabama Crimson Tide baseball players
People from Streator, Illinois
1917 births
1968 deaths